Herbert Stern, 1st Baron Michelham  (28 September 1851 – 7 January 1919), known as Sir Herbert Stern, Bt, between July and December 1905, was a British financier, philanthropist and a member of the Stern banking family.

Background
Stern was the son of Hermann de Stern, a German-born banker, head of the merchant bank Stern Brothers (London) and Portuguese baron, and Julia Goldsmid. He was the first cousin of Lord Wandsworth and Sir Edward Stern.

Career
On his father's death Stern inherited the Portuguese barony and a fortune of £2 million, which he substantially increased during his lifetime. He was a prominent philanthropist, and notably contributed to the National Gallery. During the First World War he acquired Hotel Astoria in Paris to be used as a hospital for British troops. He was also involved in thoroughbred horse racing and is known for having bred Plucky Liege, one of the most important broodmares of the 20th century.

Stern was created a Baronet, of Strawberry Hill in the Parish of Twickenham and County of Middlesex, in July 1905 and raised to the peerage as Baron Michelham, of Hellingly in the County of Sussex, in December of the same year. 

Lord Michelham was appointed a Knight Commander of the Royal Victorian Order (KCVO) in 1912.

Personal life
Lord Michelham died in Paris in January 1919, aged 67, and was succeeded by his son, Herman.

References

Sources

1851 births
1919 deaths
Barons in the Peerage of the United Kingdom
Jewish British politicians
Knights Commander of the Royal Victorian Order
Members of London County Council
English people of German-Jewish descent
English Jews
Stern family (banking)
People from Hellingly
Peers created by Edward VII
Burials at Balls Pond Road Cemetery